Murray William Goodwin (born 11 December 1972) is a former Zimbabwean cricketer who played 19 Tests and 71 One Day Internationals. He was a right-handed top-order batsman, strong on the back foot, and a good cutter and puller of the ball.

International career
Born in Rhodesia, Goodwin attended St. John's College (Harare) before his family moved to Perth when he was a 13-year old. He moved back to Zimbabwe in the 1990s, and represented the country between 1998 and 2000. His wife had trouble settling in Zimbabwe, and so, after the Zimbabwe tour of England in 2000, they moved back to Australia. Murray Goodwin now resides in southwest Western Australia with his family.

Goodwin and Grant Flower set the record for the highest 5th wicket partnership for Zimbabwe in ODI cricket (186*).

Domestic career
After his retirement from international cricket, Goodwin became a regular player for Western Australia and for Sussex in England. He made 1,183 runs for Western Australia in 2003–04, which was then the highest by a Western Australia player in a Sheffield Shield season. He highlighted his consistency with 840 runs the following season. He also played for the Netherlands as an overseas player.

Goodwin holds the Sussex record for the highest individual innings, with 344* against Somerset in 2009, beating his own record of 335* set in 2003. Goodwin's 2003 innings helped Sussex to win their first Championship title, after 164 years. He is also the only Sussex batsman to have twice made a double century and a century in the same match.

Goodwin led Sussex to the league title in the final match of the 2008 NatWest Pro40 competition. After the collapse of Sussex's top and middle order against Nottinghamshire CCC, his 87 not out from 64 balls steered Sussex to victory. Needing three runs from Charlie Shreck's final delivery to tie the match and ensure victory for Sussex in the league table, Goodwin hit a six over long-on to clinch the game.

Goodwin was released by Sussex County Cricket Club in August 2012, but was soon snapped up by Glamorgan, with whom he signed an initial 1-year contract on 17 October 2012. In his first season with Glamorgan, Goodwin averaged over 56 with the bat in the County Championship, leading to a one-year extension to his contract.

Career best performances
Updated 18 October 2013

References

External links
 

1972 births
Living people
Cricketers from Harare
White Rhodesian people
White Zimbabwean sportspeople
Netherlands cricketers
Mashonaland cricketers
Mashonaland A cricketers
Sussex cricketers
Warriors cricketers
Western Australia cricketers
Zimbabwe One Day International cricketers
Zimbabwe Test cricketers
Zimbabwean cricketers
Zimbabwean expatriates in Australia 
Zimbabwean people of British descent
Commonwealth Games competitors for Zimbabwe
Cricketers at the 1998 Commonwealth Games
Ahmedabad Rockets cricketers
Glamorgan cricketers